Gabriel N. Finder is a historian of Central and East European Jews and professor at University of Virginia.

Works

References

External links
 
 

Historians of Jews and Judaism
Historians of the Holocaust
University of Virginia faculty